"Banish from Sanctuary" is a song by the German power metal band Blind Guardian. It was released as the only single from their 1989 album Follow the Blind. The single was pressed on 7" green vinyl and includes the song "Hall of the King" (also taken from Follow the Blind) as a B-side. Only 500 copies of the vinyl were pressed.

The song is based on the story of John the Baptist in the New Testament and his imprisonment and eventual execution by Herod Antipas at the insistence of his wife, Herodias.

Track listing
 "Banish from Sanctuary" – 5:27 	
 "Hall of the King" – 4:16

Lineup
 Hansi Kürsch – vocals and bass
 André Olbrich – lead guitar
 Marcus Siepen – rhythm guitar
 Thomen Stauch – drums

References

1989 singles
Blind Guardian songs
1989 songs
Songs written by Hansi Kürsch
Songs written by André Olbrich